The University of AMIKOM Yogyakarta is a private IT college in Sleman Regency, Special Region of Yogyakarta, Indonesia. The college was established on December 29, 1992, under the auspices of the Yogyakarta AMIKOM Foundation. It has 2 diploma programs, 13 undergraduate programs, and 1 postgraduate program; all are accredited. The university concentrates on efforts to become the world's leading university in the field of the creative economy based on entrepreneurship. The university currently has more than 11,000 active students, and has more than 3,000 new students every year.

The university also runs commercial businesses, such as television channels, radio channels, 2D & 3D animation film production for cinema and television, software design and development, internet connection services, TV and outdoor advertising, computer skills training, education/IT/creative economy consulting, and animated film marketing network. This commercial company provides students with opportunities for internships. The university claims to produce 'graduates with global quality, productive, innovative, entrepreneurial, professional, especially in computer-based and informatics-based knowledge, business and entrepreneurship, innovation and creative industry'.

History 
The university evolved from a college diploma program AMIKOM Yogyakarta to become an undergraduate and post graduate program.

In 1993 the first 44 students enrolled at the Department of Information Management. A year later AMIKOM achieved listed status by the Minister of Education and Culture Republic of Indonesia No. 084/D/O/1994 dated October 11, 1994.

Before, AMIKOM operated one campus in Wolter Mongonsidi Street and one in North RingRoad Street in Yogyakarta. Beginningin academic year 1998/1999 AMIKOM converted a shop building into an integrated campus in the North Ring Road, with 9 classrooms, 1 academic service, 1 library, occupying 2 floors. All academic services moved into this integrated campus, except for some services and a  computer lab located about 5.6 miles from main campus.

In 2002, Academy of AMIKOM become STMIK AMIKOM Yogyakarta. AMIKOM obtained land and built its own building next to the existing campus. The building was occupied and used for lectures in the academic year 2001/2002. It consists of 3 floors used as an administrative center, lecture halls and laboratories.

Beginning with academic year 2003/2004, all academic activities moved to Building I and II Integrated Campus, and in May 2004 construction of Unit II and Unit III began. The building is used for lectures, meeting rooms (Hall 1 and Hall 2), computer laboratory, animated film production, a Graduation Exam Room, Mosque and a Technical Services Unit. Unit III building provided space for business units, polyclinics, the household and a Theory and Practice room to host graduate programs and a language laboratory. In 2007 Unit IV was constructed for administrative services, a bank and services BAAK, BAU, HRD, Theory Lecture Room Diploma and Under graduated Program. 

In 2010 Unit V was constructed for the library, classroom theory, and business incubator space. In 2012  Amikom Student Center was built to provide space for student activities, secretarial student organisations, meeting rooms, a special meeting of student activities and space for Pembina Foundation. In 2013 Unit VI was built to house International class lectures, faculty room, research institutes, Quality Assurance, Office of International Affairs, Film Animation production rooms, and theatres. This building has been equipped with a basement, 2 floors and an elevator.

UNESCO Report 2009 

In the annual report UNESCO 2009 - presented in World Conference on Higher Education 2009, the report A New Dynamic: Private Higher Education STMIK AMIKOM was mentioned as a private university in Yogyakarta, Indonesia.

Organizational structure 
Member of Foundation AMIKOM Yogyakarta
 Chief manager of the Foundation Dr. Muhammad Idris Purwanto, MM.
 Foundation Treasurer Business Ir. Rum M. Andri KR. M.Kom.
 Foundation Secretary Business Rahma Widyawati, SE, MM.

Faculties 
The University of AMIKOM Yogyakarta has 3 faculties and provides 3 levels of education: Diploma, Undergraduate and Post Graduate.

Faculty of Computer Science 
 Magister of Informatics (Postgraduate Programme)
 Department of Informatics (Undergraduate Programme) - Reguler Class and International Class
 Department of Information Systems for bachelor's degree (Undergraduate Programme) - Reguler Class and International Class
 Department of Information Technology for bachelor's degree (Undergraduate Programme) - Reguler Class and International Class
 Department of Computer Engineering for bachelor's degree (Undergraduate Programme) - Reguler Class and International Class
 Department of Information Management (Diploma Programme)
 Department of Informatics Engineering (Diploma Programme)

Faculty Science and Technology 
 Department of Architecture (Undergraduate Programme) 
 Department of Geography (Undergraduate Programme) 
 Department of Regional and City Planning (Undergraduate Programme)

Faculty Economics and Social Sciences 
 Department of Entrepreneurship (Undergraduate Programme) 
 Department of Economics (Undergraduate Programme) 
 Department of Accounting (Undergraduate Programme) 
 Department of International Relations (Undergraduate Programme) 
 Department of Public Administration (Undergraduate Programme)
 Department of Communication Studies (Undergraduate Programme

Concentration 
1. Magister of Informatics (Postgraduate Program) concentrations:
 Chief Information Officer Management
 Information System
 Digital Media Technology
 Animations
2. Department of Informatics (undergraduate) concentrations:
 Multimedia
 Programming
 Computer Networks
3. Department of Information Systems (undergraduate) concentrations:
 Creative Multimedia (TV Commercial, Movie, Company Profile, Learning Media)
 Developer Accounting Information System
 E-Commerce System Developer
 Financial Technology
4. Department of Computer Engineering (undergraduate) concentrations:
 Cybersecurity
 IoT
5. Department of Information Technology (undergraduate) concentrations:
 Animations 2D & 3D
 Game Development
6. Information Management (diploma). Has three concentrations, namely:
 Development of Desktop-Based Information Systems
 Development of Web-Based Information System
 Development of Multimedia-Based Information System
7. Informatics Engineering (diploma) concentrations:
 Web Development
 Computer Network
 Animations 2D

Faculty Science and Technology 
8. Department of Architecture (undergraduate) concentrations: 
 Digital Architecture
9. Department of Geography (undergraduate) concentrations: 
 GeoInformatics
 Geographic Information System
 Documentary Film
10. Department of Regional and City Planning (undergraduate) concentrations: 
 Smart City

Faculty Economics and Social Sciences 
11. Department of Entrepreneurship (undergraduate)
 Digital Entrepreneur
 Business consultant
 Business Motivator
 Business Developers
12. Department of Economics (undergraduate) concentrations:
 Creative Economy
 Digital Economics
 Business Economics and Banking
 Islamic Economics
 Tourism Economics
13. Department of Accounting (undergraduate) concentrations:
 Auditing
 Taxation
 Management and Business Accounting
14. Department of International Relations (undergraduate) concentrations:
 International Business
 International Diplomacy
 Political-Economy Global
 Politics and International Security
 Politics-Law International 
15. Department of Public Administration (undergraduate) concentrations:
 Digital Governance
 Local Governance
 Sociopreneurship
 16. Department of Communication Studies (undergraduate) concentrations:
 Marketing
 Broadcasting
 Cinema
 Visual Design

Student Organisations and Alumni 
Student Organisations in STMIK AMIKOM Yogyakarta

Student Organisations (ORMA) 
 Student Senate (SEMA)
 Student Executive Board (BEM)
 Student Association of Informatics Engineering (HMJTI)
 Student Association of Information Management and Information System (HIMMSI)
 Student Association of Computer Engineering (HIMTEK)
 Student Association of Informatic Engineering (HIMADITI)
 Student Association of Information Technology
 Student Association of Architecture
 Student Association of Geography
 Student Association of Regional and City Planning
 Student Association of Entrepreneurship
 Student Association of Economics
 Student Association of Accounting
 Student Association of International Relations
 Student Association of Public Administration
 Student Association of Communication Studies.

Student Activity Unit (UKM) 
 Students AMIKOM Yogyakarta Nature Lovers (MAYAPALA)
 AMIKOM Computer Club (AMCC)
 Manggar (performing arts)
 Journal LPM (Journalism)
 Unit of Islamic Spirituality - Islam Jama'ah Shohwatul (UKI JASTHIS)
 Association of Christian AMIKOM (IKNA)
 Community Multimedia (KOMA)
 AMIKOM English Club (AEC)
 TAEKWONDO
 AMIKOM Music Organization (AMO)

Semi-autonomous Boards(BSO) 
 Onegai-Shelter (2D & 3D Animation Community)
 Free Open Source Software Interest League (FOSSIL)
 Kempo
 AMIKOM Football Club (AFC)
 AMIKOM Basket Ball Club (ABBC)

Communities 
 Hindu Students Community (KMHD)
 Portrait-AMIKOM (Photography Community)
 Thullabu Lughoti al'Arobiyyah Jami'atu - TAMAM (Arabic Student Community)
 Shoutul Muhibbin (Community Ahlussunnah wal Jama'ah)
 Capoeira-AMIKOM (Community Capoeira Brazilian martial arts)
 Niswaramatika Choir (Choral)
 Science Olympiad of AMIKOM (Science Olympiad community)
 AMIKOM Game Development (AGD)
 AMIKOM Students Badminton Community (ASBC)
 AMIKOM-Robotic
 Anti-Drug Movement AMIKOM (GANA)
 Student Entrepreneurial Network (JAMAWI)
 Kalong Dollar (KADOL) - Community dollar collection from internet
 AMIKOM Blog Community (ABC)
 AMIKOM DOTA Community (ADC)

Forum 
 The National Student Forum (FMK)
 Class Senators Forum (FORSEKA)
 Amikom Student Association of Kebumen (IMAKA)

AMIKOM Alumni Network (JALA)

Awards

International Award 

 Name : M.Suyanto, Aryanto Yuniawan, Adi Djayusman, Lukman Chandra, Heri Sulistyo
 Creation : Battle of Surabaya (November 10)
 Category : Anime / Manga
 Place : Houston - USA
 Year : 2016

 Name : M.Suyanto, Aryanto Yuniawan, Adi Djayusman, Lukman Chandra, Heri Sulistyo
 Creation : Battle of Surabaya (November 10)
 Category : Feature Films
 Place : Seol - South Korea
 Year : 2016

 Name : M.Suyanto, Aryanto Yuniawan, Adi Djayusman, Lukman Chandra, Heri Sulistyo
 Creation : Battle of Surabaya (November 10)
 Category : Best Animation
 Place : Delhi - India
 Year : 2016

 Name : Jeki Kuswanto, Eko Rahmat Slamet Hidayat, Arvin C Frobenius
 Creation : Gablind
 Category : -
 Place : Taiwan
 Year : 2016

 Name : Elik Hari Muktafin, Budi Sulistiyo Jati, dan Heriyanto
 Creation : BSmart
 Category : -
 Place : Taiwan
 Year : 2016

 Name : Jeki Kuswanto, Eko Rahmat Slamet Hidayat, Arvin C Frobenius
 Creation : Gablind
 Category : -
 Place : Taiwan
 Year : 2016

 Name : Donni Prabowo, Pendi Ventri Hendika, dan Bety Wulan Sari
 Creation : HICO – Hybrid Smart Controller 
 Category : -
 Place : Paris
 Year : 2016

 Name : Donni Prabowo, Afif Bimantara, Bram Pratowo
 Creation : AHADA
 Category : -
 Place : Paris
 Year : 2016

 Name : Elik Hari Muktafin, Budi Sulistiyo Jati, Heriyanto
 Creation : BTOUCH
 Category : -
 Place : Paris
 Year : 2016

 Name : M.Suyanto, Aryanto Yuniawan, Adi Djayusman, Lukman Chandra, Heri Sulistyo
 Creation : Battle of Surabaya (November 10)
 Category : Official Selection
 Place : Holland
 Year : 2016

 Name : M.Suyanto, Aryanto Yuniawan, Adi Djayusman, Lukman Chandra, Heri Sulistyo
 Creation : Battle of Surabaya (November 10)
 Category : Official Selection
 Place : Ireland
 Year : 2016

 Name : M.Suyanto, Aryanto Yuniawan, Adi Djayusman, Lukman Chandra, Heri Sulistyo
 Creation : Battle of Surabaya (November 10)
 Category : Special Screening
 Place : Chitose Hokkaido - Japan
 Year : 2016

 Name : M.Suyanto, Aryanto Yuniawan, Adi Djayusman, Lukman Chandra, Heri Sulistyo
 Creation : Battle of Surabaya (November 10)
 Category : Special Screening
 Place : Greece
 Year : 2016

 Name : Donni Prabowo, Pendi Ventri Hendika, Bety Wulan Sari
 Creation : HICO – Hybrid Smart Controller 
 Category : -
 Place : Srilangka
 Year : 2015

 Name : Elik Hari Muktafin, Budi Sulistiyo Jati, Heriyanto
 Creation : BTOUCH
 Category : -
 Place : Srilangka
 Year : 2015

 Name : M.Suyanto, Aryanto Yuniawan, Adi Djayusman, Lukman Chandra, Heri Sulistyo
 Creation : Battle of Surabaya (November 10)
 Category : The Faces of Indonesia Cinema Today
 Place : Jogja - Indonesia
 Year : 2015

 Name : M.Suyanto, Aryanto Yuniawan, Adi Djayusman, Lukman Chandra, Heri Sulistyo
 Creation : Battle of Surabaya (November 10)
 Category : Best Foreign Animation Trailer/Family
 Place : Los Angeles, USA
 Year : 2014

 Name : Donni Prabowo, Afif Bimantara, Bram Pratowo
 Creation : AHADA
 Category : -
 Place : Jakarta - Indonesia
 Year : 2014

 Name : Christi Roderto R.S
 Creation : World Overclocking Competition
 Category : Master Overclocking Arena
 Place : Taiwan
 Year : 2014

 Name : Christi Roderto R.S
 Creation : APAC Overclocking Competition
 Category : Class A-Master Overclocking Arena
 Place : Indonesia
 Year : 2014

 Name : M.Suyanto, Aryanto Yuniawan, Adi Djayusman, Lukman Chandra, Heri Sulistyo
 Creation : Battle of Surabaya
 Category : People Choice
 Place : California
 Year : 2013

 Name : Donni Prabowo, Afif Bimantara, Bram Pratowo
 Creation : AHADA - Easy Care of Sensory Disturbance
 Category : E-inclusion and Community
 Place : Hong Kong
 Year : 2013

 Name : Nuruddin Miranda, Donni Prabowo, Afif Bimantara
 Creation : SHAND
 Category : -
 Place : Taiwan
 Year : 2012

 Name : -
 Creation : Websites Jogja Tourism Promotion
 Category : Websites Tourism Promotion
 Place : Beijing, China
 Year : 2011

 Name : Andi Sunyoto, M.Kom
 Creation : V-Track
 Category : Research and Development
 Place : Melbourne, Australia
 Year : 2009

 Name : Hendro Wibowo
 Creation : Interactive Table (TIWULE)
 Category : Student Project
 Place : Melbourne, Australia
 Year : 2009

 Name : M. Suyanto, Prof. Dr, M.M. and Aryanto Yuniawan, A.Md
 Creation : Good Bye World
 Category : Animation
 Place : -
 Year : 2009

 Name : Arief Setyanto, S.Si, MT
 Creation : Integrated University Management System
 Category : Education and Learning
 Place : Macao
 Year : 2006

 Name : Hanif Al Fatta, M.Kom
 Category : Tertiary Student Project
 Place : Macao
 Year : 2006

 Name : Jaeni, S.Kom
 Creation : Website
 Category : Oto Web Contest
 Place : -
 Year : 2006

 Name : Arief Setyanto, S.Si, MT
 Creation : Integrated University Management System
 Category : Education and Learning
 Place : Taiwan
 Year : 2006

 Name : Kusrini, Dr., M.Kom
 Creation : MARC to Relational-Database-System Converter for Developing Electronics Cataloques
 Place : Taiwan
 Year : 2005

 Name : M. Suyanto, Prof. Dr, M.M
 Creation : (for his dedication to the field of entrepreneurship)
 Category : Entrepreneurship
 Place : ASEAN
 Year : 2004

 Name : Jaeni, S.Kom
 Creation : Website
 Category : -
 Place : -
 Year : 2004

National Award 

 Name : Donni Prabowo, Afif Bimantara, Bram Pratowo
 Creation : Ahada - Easy Care of Sensory Disturbance
 Category : E-inclusion
 Place : Jakarta
 Year : 2013

 Name : Asro Nasiri, Drs, M.Kom dan Tohir Ismail, S.Kom
 Creation : 3D Aircraft Visualization
 Category : Research and Development
 Place : Jakarta
 Year : 2008

 Name : Andi Sunyoto, M.Kom
 Creation : V-Track
 Category : Research and Development
 Place : Jakarta
 Year : 2009

 Name : Andi Sunyoto, M.Kom
 Creation : Integration of GPS and GSM for Position Monitoring and Line Movement Moving Object
 Category : Software
 Place : Jakarta
 Year : 2006

 Name : Aryanto Yuniawan, A.Md
 Creation : Good Bye World
 Category : Digital Animation
 Place : Jakarta

 Name : Arief Setyanto, S.Si, MT
 Category : Education and Training
 Year : 2008

 Name : Kusrini, Dr., M.Kom
 Creation : Design of Expert System to Handle Child Tuberculosis Disease
 Category : ICT INDUSTRY
 Place : Ministry of Communication and Information - Jakarta
 Year : 2008

 Name : Kusrini, Dr., M.Kom
 Creation : Classification of Images using the C4.5 Algorithm Decision Tree 
 Category : Field of Engineering Science and Engineering
 Place : LIPI
 TYear : 2008

 Name : Hendro Wibowo
 Creation : Interactive Table (TIWULE).
 Category : Student Project
 Place : Jakarta
 Year : 2009

 Name : Prof.Dr. M.Suyanto, MM. and Aryanto Yuniawan, S.Kom.
 Creation : Battle of Surabaya
 Category : Digital Entertainment – Animation
 Place : Jakarta
 Year : 2012

 Name : Prof.Dr. M.Suyanto, MM. & Aryanto Yuniawan, S.Kom.
 Creation : Battle of Surabaya
 Category : Animation
 Place : Jakarta
 Year : 2012

References

External links 
  official website
  official website Amikom Surakarta
  official website Amikom Purwokerto
  Post graduate Program AMIKOM
  Admissions University of AMIKOM Yogyakarta
  

Colleges in Indonesia
1994 establishments in Indonesia
Educational institutions established in 1994